The All-Ireland Senior Hurling Championship 1925 was the 39th series of the All-Ireland Senior Hurling Championship, Ireland's premier hurling knock-out competition.  Tipperary won the championship, beating Galway 5-6 to 1-5 in the final.

Format

All-Ireland Championship

Semi-final: (2 matches) The four provincial representatives make up the semi-final pairings. The Munster and Leinster champions will be on opposite sides of the draw. Two teams are eliminated at this stage, while the two winning teams advance to the final.

Final: (1 match) The winners of the two semi-finals contest this game with the winners being declared All-Ireland champions.

Results

Leinster Senior Hurling Championship

Munster Senior Hurling Championship

Ulster Senior Hurling Championship

All-Ireland Senior Hurling Championship

Championship statistics

Miscellaneous

 Dublin defeated Kilkenny in the Leinster final, however, a subsequent objection was upheld and the result was overturned. Kilkenny were then declared champions and represented the province in the All-Ireland series.
 Antrim were nominated as the Ulster representatives in the All-Ireland series. It was the last time the Ulster champions progressed to the All-Ireland semi-final until 1943. The Ulster Championship took place after the completion of the All-Ireland series, which Antrim went on to win.

Sources

 Corry, Eoghan, The GAA Book of Lists (Hodder Headline Ireland, 2005).
 Donegan, Des, The Complete Handbook of Gaelic Games (DBA Publications Limited, 2005).

References

1925